Akhilendra Mishra is an Indian film and television character actor best known for his role as Kroor Singh in the 1990s Doordarshan fantasy television series Chandrakanta. His other notable works include the character of Mirchi Seth in the 1999 critically acclaimed film Sarfarosh. He also played the character of Arjan in the Academy Award nominated film Lagaan. He played the demon king Ravana in the 2008 television adaptation of the Hindu epic Ramayana.

Mishra played the antagonist opposite Salman Khan in Veergati released in 1995.

Early life and career
Mishra was born in Siwan, Bihar. He did his schooling from Chhapra Zila School and attended Chapra's Rajendra College where he pursued Bachelor of Science in Physics (Honours). Although he wanted to become an engineer, Mishra started doing theatre at a young age with his first role in a Bhojpuri drama based on a story about child marriage titled Gauna Ki Rat. He later joined Indian People's Theatre Association (IPTA) and Ekjut theatre group to learn acting.

Mishra was first seen in Udaan, written and directed by Kavita Chaudhary, in which he did a small role. In 1994, Mishra played Kroor Singh, a character for which he is best known, in the 1990s fantasy television series Chandrakanta.

Mishra's first film was Dharavi in 1993, written-directed by Sudhir Mishra, which won the 1993 National Film Award for Best Feature Film in Hindi, Best Music Direction and Best Editing. He also played Arjan in the Academy Award nominated film Lagaan.

Filmography

Dharavi (1992)
Bedardi (1993) - Akhil Mishra
Veergati (1995) - Ikka
Do Ankhen Barah Hath (1997) - Ikka
Sarfarosh (1999) - Mirchi Seth
Tarkieb (2000) - Bishen Nanda / Killer her hand leg
Lagaan (2001) - Arjan
Lal Salaam (2002) - Rathod (Forest Ranger)
The Legend of Bhagat Singh (2002) - Chandra Shekhar Azad
Gangaajal (2003) - DSP Bhurelal
Aanch (2003) - Kalu Pandit
Parwana (2003) - Police Commissioner Tyagi
Mumbai Se Aaya Mera Dost (2003) - Priest
Yeh Dil (2003) - Raghuraj Pratap Singh
Hulchul (2004) - Surajbhan 'Surya'
Fida (2004) - Babu Anna
Deewaar: Let's Bring Our Heroes Home (2004)
Jaago (2004) - Secy to Home Ministry (IAS officer)
Veer-Zaara (2004) - Jailor Majid Khan
Siddu (2005; Kannada film) - Rangegowda
Apaharan (2005) - CM Brijnath Mishra
Shikhar (2005) - Irfan bhai
Ek Ajnabee (2005) - ACP Harvinder 'Harry' Singh
Ramji Londonwaley (2005) - Mr. Mishra
Nigehbaan: The Third Eye (2005)
Utthaan (2006)
Bhoot Unkle (2006) - Makhan Lal Akela (MLA)
Shootout at Lokhandwala (2007) - DCP Tripathi
Aaja Nachle (2007) - Chaudhary Om Singh
Chamku (2008) - Thakur Mahendra Pratap Singh
Drona (2008)
Delhi-6 (2009) - Baba Bandarmaar
Do Dooni Chaar (2010) - Farooqi
Musaa (2010)
Atithi Tum Kab Jaoge? (2010) - Suleman bhai
Kedi (2010) - Shailendra
Ready (2011) - Amar Chaudhry
Married 2 America (2012)
Ya Rab (2014) - Maulana Jilani
 Roll No. 56 (Gujarati Film) - Panwala
 Kaabil (2017) - Wasim's father
 Anjani Putra (Kannada Movie) (2017) - Raj Thakur
 Billu Ustaad (2018) - (unknown)
Kaashi in Search of Ganga (2018)
 Jhalki (2019)
 Surya (2023)

Television 
Udaan (TV series) (1990) - Hardayal Singh
Chandrakanta (TV series) (1995) - Kroor Singh
Ramayan (TV series) (2008) - Ravana
Jeet Jayenge Hum (TV series) (2009)
Devon Ke Dev...Mahadev (TV series) (2012) - Maharaj Bali
Diya Aur Baati Hum (TV series) (2014)
Mahabharat (TV series) (2013) - Kamsa
Tu Mera Hero (TV series) (2014) - Govindnarayan Agarwal
Khatmal E Ishq (TV series) (2016–present)

References

External links

Akhilendra Mishra's interview

Indian male film actors
Indian male television actors
Living people
People from Siwan, Bihar
Male actors in Hindi cinema
Male actors from Bihar
20th-century Indian male actors
21st-century Indian male actors
1962 births